Bloomingdale (or Blone Dalen) is an unincorporated community in Vernon County, Wisconsin. The community is located on the border of the towns of Clinton and Webster.

Notable people
Joseph D. Beck, Wisconsin politician

Notes

Unincorporated communities in Vernon County, Wisconsin
Unincorporated communities in Wisconsin